The  or  is an expressway that links the wards Tarumi-ku and Nishi-ku of Kobe, Hyōgo Prefecture, Japan. It is owned and operated by West Nippon Expressway Company and is signed as E94 under the Ministry of Land, Infrastructure, Transport and Tourism's (MLIT) "2016 Proposal for Realization of Expressway Numbering."

History
In 1998, the Kitasen Road was opened in conjunction with the Kobe-Awaji-Naruto Expressway.

Future
MLIT is in the process of acquiring right of way to build a  extension of the Kitasen Road to link up with the Daini-Shinmei Road in the neighboring city, Akashi.

Junction list
The entire expressway is in Kobe, Hyōgo Prefecture. 

References

See also

Daini-Shinmei Road
West Nippon Expressway Company

Expressways in Japan
Transport in Kobe